Shurkeh (also Romanized as Shūrkeh; also known as Shūr-e Bālā and Shūrkeh-ye Bālā) is a village in Doreh Rural District, in the Central District of Sarbisheh County, South Khorasan Province, Iran. At the 2006 census, its population was 124, in 32 families.

References 

Populated places in Sarbisheh County